The 1995 AXA Equity & Law League was the twenty-seventh competing of English cricket's Sunday League.  The competition was won for the fourth time by Kent County Cricket Club.

Standings

Batting averages

Bowling averages

See also
 Sunday League

References

AXA
Pro40